Woo Seung-yeon (24 May 1983 – 27 April 2009) was a South Korean model and actress.

Biography

Career 
Woo began her career as a fashion model in magazine and television commercials, and had appeared in minor roles in the films Herb (2007) and Private Eye (2009). She had been affiliated with management agency Yedang Entertainment in 2008, but switched to Oracle Entertainment in February 2009. Woo had been undergoing treatment for depression, having been under severe stress following a number of failed auditions. At the time of her death, she was on a leave of absence from Chung-Ang University where she studied French language and literature.

Death and legacy 
On 28 April 2009, Woo was found hanged at her home in Jamsil-dong, Seoul, in an apparent suicide. Her body was discovered at 7:40 pm by her roommate. Prior to her death, Woo sent a text message to her sister saying "I'm sorry", and left a note in her diary that read, "I love my family. I am so sorry to leave early." Police believe that depression over her situation and fear of the future led to her suicide.

Filmography

See also 
 Suicide in South Korea

References

External links
 
 

1983 births
2009 deaths
South Korean film actresses
South Korean female models
Suicides by hanging in South Korea
2009 suicides
Female suicides